Carabus gyllenhali is a species of ground beetle from Carabinae family that is endemic to Ukraine./Russia

References

gyllenhali
Beetles described in 1827
Endemic fauna of Ukraine
Beetles of Europe